Coleophora sogdianae is a moth of the family Coleophoridae. It is found in Afghanistan, Iran, Pakistan and Oman.

References

sogdianae
Invertebrates of the Arabian Peninsula
Moths of Asia
Moths described in 1994